Limburg United, for sponsorship reasons named Hubo Limburg United, is a professional basketball club based in Hasselt, Limburg, Belgium. 

Founded in 2014, the club plays in the BNXT League, the first tier of basketball in Belgium. The team plays its home games in Sporthal Alverberg. Limburg has won one trophy, the Belgian Cup in 2022.

History 
Around the beginning of 2014 Limburg United was founded in the city of Hasselt. The name expressing the founders' motivation for there to be a top tier basketball team from Limburg province in the aftermath of Bree B.B.C. relegating from BLB Division I in 2008 and eventually disbanding. Limburg United asked for a B-licence for the 2014–15 Basketball League Belgium, and eventually got it. Former Antwerp Giants assistant Brian Lynch signed a 5-year contract to become United's head coach. The long-term goal of the club was expressed to "become a club in the subtop of Belgium in 3 or 5 years." In the 2016–17 season, Limburg reached the Final of the Belgian Basketball Cup but lost to Telenet Oostende.

Since the 2021–22 season, United plays in the BNXT League, in which the national leagues of Belgium and the Netherlands have been merged. On 14 March 2022, Limburg United won its first-ever trophy when it captured the Belgian Cup after defeating Oostende in the final.

Honours
Belgian Basketball Cup
Champions (1): 2021–22
Runner-up (1): 2016–17

Sponsorship names

Due to sponsorship reasons, the club has been known as:
Hubo Limburg United (2014–present)

Roster

Current roster

Depth chart

Season by season

Players

Notable players

 Robert Loe 
 Seamus Boxley  
 Jordan Hulls 
 Stanton Kidd 
 Jesse Sanders 

Austin Price (born 1995), American

References

Basketball teams in Belgium
Sport in Limburg (Belgium)
Basketball teams established in 2014
Pro Basketball League